Maximilian Bernhard Domarus (1911–1992) was a German writer, historian, researcher, archivist, translator, and publicist.

Domarus is best known for his historical work on the Third Reich and the speeches of Adolf Hitler. Domarus was the author and editor of the 3,400-page, four volume set entitled Hitler: Speeches and Proclamations 1932–1945: The Chronicle of a Dictatorship. Domarus' work is generally considered the most essential and reliable resource on the speeches of Hitler and a unique chronicle of the Third Reich.
However, there were also chronological mistakes in the first original Edition. These were later used in the unmasking of Konrad Kujau's forged 'Hitler Diaries'.

Bibliography 
 Domarus, M. (1990). Hitler: Speeches and Proclamations 1932 – 1934. The Chronicle of a Dictatorship. V1.  
 Domarus, M. (1992). Hitler: Speeches and Proclamations 1935 – 1938. The Chronicle of a Dictatorship. V2.  
 Domarus, M. (1996). Hitler: Speeches and Proclamations 1939 – 1940. The Chronicle of a Dictatorship. V3.  
 Domarus, M. (2004). Hitler: Speeches and Proclamations 1941 – 1945. The Chronicle of a Dictatorship. V4.

See also 
 Hitler: Speeches and Proclamations
 List of Adolf Hitler speeches
 List of Adolf Hitler books

1911 births
1992 deaths
Historians of Nazism
20th-century German historians
German male non-fiction writers